Christophe De Kepper is a Belgian lawyer and sports administrator, director-general and a member of the executive board of the International Olympic Committee (IOC) since April 2011, when he succeeded Urs Lacotte in the role.

References

Belgian sports executives and administrators
International Olympic Committee members
Living people
Year of birth missing (living people)